In mathematics, specifically in complex geometry, the Kähler quotient of a Kähler manifold  by a Lie group  acting on  by preserving the Kähler structure and with moment map  (with respect to the Kähler form) is the quotient

If  acts freely and properly, then  is a new Kähler manifold whose Kähler form is given by the symplectic quotient construction.

See also

Hyperkähler quotient

References

Complex manifolds